The S36 is a regional railway service of the Zürich S-Bahn operated by THURBO. The S41's western terminus became Bülach.

Route 
 

The service runs from Bülach, in the canton of Zürich, to Koblenz, in the canton of Aargau, on the Winterthur to Koblenz line. At Koblenz, the service reverses direction and continues to Waldshut in Germany, using a short stretch of the Turgi to Waldshut line and crossing the historic Waldshut–Koblenz Rhine Bridge.

Map

Stations 
The service operates hourly and stops at the following stations:

 
 
 
 
 
 
 
 
 
 
 
 Swiss-German border

References

External links 
 

Zürich S-Bahn lines
Transport in Aargau
Transport in the canton of Zürich